Thomas Allison (20 February 1921 – 1 November 2010) was an English footballer who made six appearances in the Football League playing as an inside forward for Darlington in the 1940s. He also played non-league football for South Hetton. The son of William Allison, a well-known local amateur footballer, Allison signed as a professional with Darlington in October 1946.

References

1921 births
2010 deaths
People from Houghton-le-Spring
Footballers from Tyne and Wear
English footballers
Association football inside forwards
Darlington F.C. players
English Football League players